Santosh Thundiyil is an Indian cinematographer. He is best known for films like Kuch Kuch Hota Hai (1998), Devadoothan (2000), Krrish (2006), Pinjar (2003), Rowdy Rathore (2012) and Jai Ho (2014).

Early life and education
Santosh grew up in the town of Changanacherry in Kerala.  He was a student of Sacred Heart English Medium School and graduated in chemistry from St. Berchmans College, Changanacherry. Santosh did his post graduate diploma in cinematography from the prestigious FTII, Pune in India in 1994. As a student, he was selected for representing Asia in the second European seminar for student directors of photography conducted in the National Film School, Hungary in Budapest, under Oscar-winning British Cinematographer billy williams (Gandhi) Dean Cundey.

Career
Santosh, who has assisted renowned directors of photography like Govind Nihlani, Venu and Binod Pradhan, also has a number of commercials and documentary films to his credit. He is trained under Oscar winning Billy Williams (Gandhi) and Dean Cundey (Jurassic Park) representing the country in the second European Seminar for Student Directors of Photography. Now as he continues his profession he is also a visiting Professor in National Institutes like Indian Institute of Technology, MUMBAI (IIT MUMBAI) and Film and Television Institute of India, Pune (FTII, Pune).

Filmography

Films

Web series

Awards and nominations
Filmfare Award
 2012 - Filmfare Award for Best Cinematographer -Rowdy Rathore Nomination
Asianet Film Awards
 2008 - Best Cinematographer Award -Aakasha Gopuram
 2006 - Best Cinematographer Award -Palunku
2005-  [ star screen award #best cinematography award for pinjar

References

External links
Official Site
 
Cinematics India

Year of birth missing (living people)
Living people
Malayalam film cinematographers
Film and Television Institute of India alumni
People from Changanassery
21st-century Indian photographers
20th-century Indian photographers
Cinematographers from Kerala